Muhammad Radhi bin Mohd Yusof (born 11 February 1993) is a Malaysian footballer who plays as a centre-back.

References

External links
 

1993 births
Living people
Malaysian footballers
People from Terengganu
Terengganu F.C. II players
Terengganu FC players
Malaysia Super League players
Malaysia Premier League players
Malaysian people of Malay descent
Association football defenders